Wulugu Naaba Professor John Nabila Sebiyam  is a Ghanaian, politician, geographer and academia. He is the Paramount Chief of the Kpasenkpe traditional area in the North East Region of Ghana. He served as the president of the National House of Chiefs from 2008 to 2016. He was  a member of the Ghana National Petroleum Corporation board. He was the Minister for Information and Tourism in the Limann government.He later became the Minister of Special Duties during Limann government

Early and working life
John Nabila hails from the Kpasenkpe in the North East Region of Ghana. He started his school at Kpasenkpe L/A school and later in his life , he  went to Accra to further his education Professor John Sebiyam  Nabila was employed at the Geography and Resource Development, University of Ghana, Legon as a lecturer. He rose to the rank of Associate professor and Head of Department. He also served as Head of the Population Impact Project, in the  University of Ghana. Because he had worked on several geography related issues in Ghana. He is seen as an advocate  and philanthropist  for improved family life policies. he has help the people of kpasenkpe to have potable water, fixing of spoilt boreholes, buying and fixing of health equipment and helping the community to improve on education by keeping the bungalows in shape and help improve the lives of all

Chief Of Wulugu Traditional Area 
John Nabila was enskinned as Wulugu Naba -  Paramount chief of the Wulugu Traditional Area. The traditional area  wulugu, is within the West Mamprusi municipality in the [North East Region (Ghana). As paramount chief, he has sought for the well-being of his people by promoting activities that encourage the improvement of the livelihood of his people.

President of House of Chiefs 
In 2008 he contested the presidency of the National House of Chiefs. He won by obtaining 34 out of 47 valid votes cast. His contender was Daasebre Professor Oti Boateng, paramount chief of the New-Juaben Traditional Area, who had 13 votes. He stood unopposed during the 2012 house elections. As president of the house, he played several roles in advocating for improved health conditions for medical personnel and patients. He used all avenues to preach peace to Ghanaians especially during national elections. During his time as president, he authored the "National House of Chiefs’ Code of Royal Ethics for Chiefs", which is a reference material for the conduct of members of the House. He also used his position to intervene and finding solutions national disputes including helping to resolve a 2015 impasse between striking medical Doctors and the Government of Ghana over conditions of service.  His term as president of the house ended in 2016. He handed over to Togbe Afede XIV, the Agbogbomefia of the Asogli State.

Positions 
 Former Minister for Information and Tourism
 Former Minister for Information, Presidential and Special Affairs
 Former President, National House of Chiefs
 Member, Ghana National Petroleum Corporation Board
 Member, Legal Affairs Committee, NHC
 Member, International Union for the Scientific Study of Population
 Member, Social Science and Medicine Africa Network
 Vice Chairman, National Population Council
 Former Head, Department of Geography and Resource Development (UG)
 Editor, Bulletin of the Ghana Geographical Association

Appointments 
In 2017, President of the republic of Ghana  Nana Akuffo-Addo appointed him to be a board member of the Ghana National Petroleum Corporation.

References

Living people
Ghanaian geographers
Ghanaian leaders
Academic staff of the University of Ghana
People from Northern Region (Ghana)
Year of birth missing (living people)
Ghanaian MPs 1979–1981
Tamale Senior High School alumni